The 67th Massachusetts General Court, consisting of the Massachusetts Senate and the Massachusetts House of Representatives, met in 1846 during the governorship of George N. Briggs. William B. Calhoun served as president of the Senate and Samuel H. Walley, Jr. served as speaker of the House.

Senators

Representatives

See also
 29th United States Congress
 List of Massachusetts General Courts

References

External links
 
 

Political history of Massachusetts
Massachusetts legislative sessions
massachusetts
1846 in Massachusetts